Hibernia Basketball was an Irish basketball team, created by Basketball Ireland to participate in the 2015–16 FIBA Europe Cup. The team's home arena was the National Basketball Arena, based in Tallaght, South Dublin, and the playing roster consisted of Premier League players. The team made its debut on 28 October 2015 against Danish club Bakken Bears, losing 96–60. They finished the tournament with a winless 0–6 record, finishing last in Group F and earning a tournament-worst point difference figure of 243 (345 points for, 588 against).

Roster

References

External links
Basketball Ireland official website
Hibernia Basketball @ FIBAEurope.com

Basketball teams in Ireland
2015 establishments in Ireland
Basketball teams established in 2015